Ikoyi is the most affluent neighborhood of Lagos, located in Eti-Osa Local Government Area. It lies to the northeast of Obalende and adjoins Lagos Island to the west, and at the edge of the Lagos Lagoon. Popular with the extreme upper class residents of Nigerian society, Ikoyi is arguably one of the wealthiest communities within Nigeria.

The area that makes up Ikoyi was originally a continuous land mass with Lagos Island, until it was separated from it by the MacGregor canal, a narrow waterway that was dug by the British colonial government. This canal has now been built over or filled in, so that the island is fused with Lagos Island once again. It has been called in derogatory terms the "Beverly Hills by the slum" or the Belgravia of Lagos.

History
During the colonial era, the island was developed as a residential cantonment for the expatriate British community and still retains many of the large colonial residences built between 1900 and 1950.

In the 1920s and 1930s, about 250 acres of land within South West Ikoyi and Obalende were reclaimed and redeveloped. The scheme also led to the redevelopment of a road to connect Onikan with Bourdillon Rd.

Upmarket residential properties continued to be built after the colonial period, and the Island and its Dodan Barracks became the residence of some of Nigeria's military rulers. Ikoyi now contains many other government buildings as well as businesses, hotels, schools, the famous social club Ikoyi Club, and Ikoyi Golf Club.

Modern history
One of the main attractions in Ikoyi is Awolowo Road, which is a high street lined with upscale shops and boutiques. Due to its proximity to Victoria Island and Lagos Island, much of Lagos's business tourism is centred on Ikoyi, which has a mix of excellent 4-star hotels.

Owing to recent unrest in the Niger Delta, several oil companies have moved their expatriate staff to Ikoyi. The area is now home to several large luxury apartments, estates, and upscale office developments. Lagos Preparatory School (13+), regarded as Africa's most highly accredited British School, is located in Ikoyi.

Collapse

On November 1, 2021, a 21-storey building on Gerrard Road collapsed during its construction, killing several workers.

Economy and sites
Google Nigeria is headquartered in Ikoyi.

The Lagos Jet Ski Riders Club, an elite club for the wealthiest of Nigerians is located in Ikoyi.

Ikoyi Golf Club

The Falamo garden

Government and infrastructure
The National Drug Law Enforcement Agency (NDLEA) is headquartered in Ikoyi.

The World Health Organisation (WHO) has its Lagos office in Ikoyi.

The Nigerian Government Presidential Secretariat is headquartered in Ikoyi.

The Deputy-Governor of Lagos State lives in Ikoyi.

All of Nigeria's Billionaires maintain property in Ikoyi.

"Africa's most valuable treasured real estate"

Ikoyi has some of the most opulent residential facilities in Nigeria, and is thought to have the most expensive real estate on the entire African continent, with the average new apartment selling for US$1.5 million, that can reach as high as $10 million. However, due to the limited available land, many of these are vertical apartment buildings. Houses in Ikoyi are rare and belong only to the ultra-rich. Mike Adenuga, Aliko Dangote, Folorunsho Alakija amongst others hold houses in Ikoyi. Ikoyi Crescent houses the Consular-General of the United States of America to Nigeria.

Bourdillon Road, Alexander Road and Gerrard Road, is a long stretch of road, that is considered to be the most prestigious not only in Lagos, but in Nigeria. This stretch covers the Embassy of France, Embassy of Iran, Embassy of Iraq, the Lekki-Ikoyi Link Bridge, the Commissioner of Lagos Police, the Deputy-Governor of Lagos State, National Army Headquarters Liaison Office, Federal Secretariat of Nigeria, the home of the former Lagos State Governor, Bola Tinubu. and the newest addition to the list, Africa's tallest residential building. At 43 floors, apartments in this building start at 6,500 square feet and begin to sell at $10 million.

Other luxury apartment buildings on this road are: Tango Towers (30 apartments, $3m upwards), Mabadeje Plaza (for rent only), Luxury Gardens (20 luxury apartments $2m upwards), Titanium Towers (35 luxury apartments).

This development is a radical departure from Ikoyi's original design, which was originally composed of modest single-family residences with large gardens. Considering the lack of constant electricity, pipe-borne water, and general decay in basic infrastructure that is typical of Lagos, concerns have been raised as to whether Ikoyi has the necessary road and water infrastructure to continue to sustain this type of development.

The Vantage Bourdillon Apartments is another newest development on Bourdillon Road, Ikoyi

Ikoyi includes the newer suburbs of Banana Island, Parkview Estate, Mojisola Onikoyi Estate, Osborne Foreshore Estate Phase I & II, Dolphin Estate and other luxurious blocks of flats that are springing up.

Climate
Ikoyi is one of the regions with the highest amount of rainfall in Lagos, with rain often exceeding 300 cm every year.

References

 
Islands of Lagos
Neighborhoods of Lagos
Shopping districts and streets
Financial districts
Islands of Yorubaland
Lagos Island